is a Japanese long jumper. He is the 2006 national champion in the event and finished sixth at the 2006 Asian Games.

Personal bests

International competition

National titles
Japanese Championships
Long jump: 2006

References

External links

Kenji Fujikawa at JAAF 

1987 births
Living people
Sportspeople from Tokushima Prefecture
Japanese male long jumpers
Japan Championships in Athletics winners